Robert Waithman (1764 – 6 February 1833) was a master draper who in later life was a British politician; an economic progressive Whig from an industrial background and a political reformist. He became an alderman of the Corporation of London who elected him as Lord Mayor of London for a standard tenure, one ceremonial year.

Biography
Waithman was born at Wrexham, to John Waithman, a joiner at the Bersham Ironworks, and Mary (née Roberts).

After being employed for some time in a London linen draper's, he opened, about 1786, a draper's shop of his own, and made a considerable fortune. On 14 July 1787 he married Mary Davis, his cousin.  In 1818 he was returned to Parliament, as a Whig, for the City of London. He lost his seat at the election of 1820, but regained it in 1826, and retained it till his death, taking part vigorously in the parliamentary debates, and strenuously supporting reform.

In 1820 he was appointed Sheriff of the City of London and in 1823 elected Lord Mayor of London. Waithman died in London on 6 February 1833. An obelisk erected by his friends in Ludgate Circus, London, adjoining the site of his first shop, commemorated his memory. The obelisk today forms the main monument in Salisbury Square.

Notes

References

External links
 
 

1764 births
1833 deaths
People from Wrexham
Sheriffs of the City of London
19th-century lord mayors of London
19th-century English politicians
Whig (British political party) MPs for English constituencies
UK MPs 1818–1820
UK MPs 1826–1830
UK MPs 1830–1831
UK MPs 1831–1832
UK MPs 1832–1835